Play Pause Stop is a 2006 album from the Benevento/Russo Duo.  Made up of only Marco Benevento and Joe Russo, the album contains the two playing only keyboards and drums, respectively. As reviewer Benjy Eisen of NIPP writes, "it is a rock album — but there is no guitarist, no bassist, and you can sing along even though there are no words."

Track listing
"Play Pause Stop" - 7:58
"Echo Park" - 3:44
"Soba" - 4:49
"Best Reason To Buy The Sun" - 5:40
"Powder" - 3:44
"Something For Rockets" - 6:06
"Walking, Running, Viking" - 3:17
"Hate Frame" - 8:14
"Memphis" - 4:17

Notes and references

2006 albums
Benevento/Russo Duo albums